Steven John Smith (born July 21, 1952) is an American baseball coach. Smith was formerly the third-base coach for the Cleveland Indians. He has also held the same position with the Seattle Mariners, Texas Rangers, Philadelphia Phillies, and Cincinnati Reds. He has also been a minor-league manager in the San Diego Padres, Texas Rangers, Seattle Mariners, and Milwaukee Brewers organizations.

Baseball career

Playing career
As a player, Smith was primarily a second baseman and shortstop, though he played a few games at third base and even made one appearance as a pitcher. He played in the San Diego Padres organization from 1976 to 1982, playing for the Single-A Walla Walla Padres and Reno Silver Sox, the Double-A Amarillo Gold Sox, and the Triple-A Hawaii Islanders. Smith played over three seasons at Triple-A Hawaii, but was never called up by the major league club. His playing career ended after the 1982 season at the age of 28.

Coaching career
From 1983 to 1989, Smith managed the Single-A Salem Redbirds, Miami Marlins, and Reno Padres, the Double-A Beaumont Golden Gators and Wichita Pilots, and the Triple-A Las Vegas Stars, all of which were Padres affiliates at the time he managed them. He then spent the 1990 season managing the Double-A Oklahoma City 89ers in the Texas Rangers organization. Smith then went to the Seattle Mariners organization, managing the Single-A Advanced Peninsula Pilots in 1991, the Triple-A Calgary Cannons in 1994, and the Triple-A Tacoma Rainiers in 1995.

He then returned to the minor leagues in 2000, managing the Triple-A Indianapolis Indians of the Milwaukee Brewers organization. He returned to major league coaching in  when he became the third-base coach for the Texas Rangers, a position he held until . The Phillies dismissed him after the  season. Smith was named as the infield and third base coach with the Cleveland Indians on November 16, 2009 and remained with the team until after the 2012 season. Smith served as the Cincinnati Reds third base coach during the 2014 season, but was not retained by the Reds following the season.

Personal life and other media
Smith lives in Encinitas, California. He, along with his daughter Allison, competed in the sixteenth season of the CBS reality program The Amazing Race. Steve and Allie finished in sixth place and were eliminated on the April 4, 2010 episode in Malaysia.

References

External links

 Cleveland Indians Bio
 Baseball-Reference.com stats
 The Amazing Race profile

1952 births
Living people
Amarillo Gold Sox players
Baseball infielders
Cleveland Indians coaches
Hawaii Islanders players
Indianapolis Indians managers
Las Vegas 51s managers
Major League Baseball third base coaches
People from Encinitas, California
Philadelphia Phillies coaches
Reno Silver Sox players
Seattle Mariners coaches
Sportspeople from Canton, Ohio
Texas Rangers coaches
The Amazing Race (American TV series) contestants
Walla Walla Padres players
Pepperdine Waves baseball players
Baseball players from Canton, Ohio